Glukhovo is the name of several  rural localities in Russia.

Ivanovo Oblast
As of 2010, two rural localities in Ivanovo Oblast bear this name:
Glukhovo, Kineshemsky District, Ivanovo Oblast, a village in Kineshemsky District
Glukhovo, Vichugsky District, Ivanovo Oblast, a village in Vichugsky District

Kaluga Oblast
As of 2010, one rural locality in Kaluga Oblast bears this name:
Glukhovo, Kaluga Oblast, a village in Medynsky District

Kostroma Oblast
As of 2010, one rural locality in Kostroma Oblast bears this name:
Glukhovo, Kostroma Oblast, a village in Dmitriyevskoye Settlement of Galichsky District

Leningrad Oblast
As of 2010, one rural locality in Leningrad Oblast bears this name:
Glukhovo, Leningrad Oblast, a village in Kipenskoye Settlement Municipal Formation of Lomonosovsky District

Moscow Oblast
As of 2010, four rural localities in Moscow Oblast bear this name:
Glukhovo, Sinkovskoye Rural Settlement, Dmitrovsky District, Moscow Oblast, a village in Sinkovskoye Rural Settlement of Dmitrovsky District
Glukhovo, Yakhroma, Dmitrovsky District, Moscow Oblast, a village under the administrative jurisdiction of the Town of Yakhroma in Dmitrovsky District
Glukhovo, Krasnogorsky District, Moscow Oblast, a village in Ilyinskoye Rural Settlement of Krasnogorsky District
Glukhovo, Ruzsky District, Moscow Oblast, a village in Staroruzskoye Rural Settlement of Ruzsky District

Nizhny Novgorod Oblast
As of 2010, two rural localities in Nizhny Novgorod Oblast bear this name:
Glukhovo, Diveyevsky District, Nizhny Novgorod Oblast, a selo in Glukhovsky Selsoviet of Diveyevsky District
Glukhovo, Voskresensky District, Nizhny Novgorod Oblast, a selo in Glukhovsky Selsoviet of Voskresensky District

Novgorod Oblast
As of 2010, two rural localities in Novgorod Oblast bear this name:
Glukhovo, Batetsky District, Novgorod Oblast, a village in Batetskoye Settlement of Batetsky District
Glukhovo, Okulovsky District, Novgorod Oblast, a village in Borovenkovskoye Settlement of Okulovsky District

Pskov Oblast
As of 2010, three rural localities in Pskov Oblast bear this name:
Glukhovo, Loknyansky District, Pskov Oblast, a village in Loknyansky District
Glukhovo, Novorzhevsky District, Pskov Oblast, a village in Novorzhevsky District
Glukhovo, Pushkinogorsky District, Pskov Oblast, a village in Pushkinogorsky District

Smolensk Oblast
As of 2010, two rural localities in Smolensk Oblast bear this name:
Glukhovo, Smolensky District, Smolensk Oblast, a village in Pionerskoye Rural Settlement of Smolensky District
Glukhovo, Ugransky District, Smolensk Oblast, a village in Zhelanyinskoye Rural Settlement of Ugransky District

Republic of Tatarstan
As of 2010, one rural locality in the Republic of Tatarstan bears this name:
Glukhovo, Republic of Tatarstan, a village in Vysokogorsky District

Tver Oblast
As of 2010, four rural localities in Tver Oblast bear this name:
Glukhovo, Kesovogorsky District, Tver Oblast, a village in Kesovogorsky District
Glukhovo, Kimrsky District, Tver Oblast, a village in Kimrsky District
Glukhovo (Ostashkovskoye Rural Settlement), Torzhoksky District, Tver Oblast, a village in Torzhoksky District; municipally, a part of Ostashkovskoye Rural Settlement of that district
Glukhovo (Vysokovskoye Rural Settlement), Torzhoksky District, Tver Oblast, a village in Torzhoksky District; municipally, a part of Vysokovskoye Rural Settlement of that district

Udmurt Republic
As of 2010, one rural locality in the Udmurt Republic bears this name:
Glukhovo, Udmurt Republic, a village in Kigbayevsky Selsoviet of Sarapulsky District

Vladimir Oblast
As of 2010, one rural locality in Vladimir Oblast bears this name:
Glukhovo, Vladimir Oblast, a selo in Sobinsky District

Yaroslavl Oblast
As of 2010, two rural localities in Yaroslavl Oblast bear this name:
Glukhovo, Uglichsky District, Yaroslavl Oblast, a village in Uleyminsky Rural Okrug of Uglichsky District
Glukhovo, Yaroslavsky District, Yaroslavl Oblast, a village in Pestretsovsky Rural Okrug of Yaroslavsky District